Aliens! is a themed anthology of  science fiction short works edited by American writers Gardner Dozois and Jack Dann, the first in a series of themed anthologies. It was first published in paperback by Pocket Books in April 1980. Subsequent volumes in the series were published by Ace Books.

Summary
The book collects fourteen novellas, novelettes and short stories by various science fiction authors, including four Draco Tavern stories by Larry Niven, with a general foreword and individual introductions to each piece by the editors, together with a bibliography of further reading.

Contents
"Foreword" (Gardner Dozois and Jack Dann)
"Assimilating Our Culture, That's What They're Doing" (Larry Niven)
"Grammar Lesson" (Larry Niven)
"The Subject Is Closed" (Larry Niven)
"Cruel and Unusual" (Larry Niven)
"We Purchased People" (Frederik Pohl)
"Guesting Time" (R. A. Lafferty)
"And I Awoke and Found Me Here on the Cold Hill's Side" (James Tiptree, Jr.)
"Angel's Egg" (Edgar Pangborn)
"Oh, to Be a Blobel!" (Philip K. Dick)
"Be Merry" (Algis Budrys)
"Pattern" (Fredric Brown)
"An Honorable Death" (Gordon R. Dickson)
"The Reality Trip" (Robert Silverberg)
"Rule Golden" (Damon Knight)
"Alien-Human Relations - A Guide to Further Reading"

Notes

1980 anthologies
Science fiction anthologies
Jack Dann and Gardner Dozois Ace anthologies
Pocket Books books
Books with cover art by Michael Whelan
1980s science fiction works